is a railway station in Minamiaizu, Minamiaizu District, Fukushima Prefecture, Japan, operated by the Aizu Railway.

Lines
Aizukōgen-Ozeguchi Station is served by the Aizu Line, and is located 56.4 rail kilometers from the official starting point of the line at Nishi-Wakamatsu Station. It is also a terminus for the Yagan Railway Aizu Kinugawa Line and is located 30.7 rail kilometers from the opposing terminal at Shin-Fujiwara Station.

Station layout
Aizukōgen-Ozeguchi Station has a single island platform connected to the station building by a level crossing.

Adjacent stations

History
The Yagen Railway connected to this station on May 1, 1966. The station name was changed  on October 9, 1986, and to its present name on March 18, 2006.

Surrounding area
 
 Arakai River
Takihara Post Office

Bus routes
 Aizu Bus
 Aizukōgen-Ozeguchi Station - Yunohana Onsen - Tateiwa Tourist Information Desk - Tokusa iriguchi - Uchikawa - Hinoemata - Mike - Oze Numayama Pass
Partly services which run during summer are express which passes bus stops between AizuKogen-Ozeguchi Station and Mori no Onsenkan Aruza, so when use the service passengers must pay additional fares at 300 yen.

References

External links

 Aizu Railway Station information 
Yagen Railway Station information 

Railway stations in Fukushima Prefecture
Aizu Line
Railway stations in Japan opened in 1953
Minamiaizu, Fukushima